The Lytton Mausoleum is a family mausoleum in Knebworth Park, Hertfordshire, England.

Description
The mausoleum was commissioned by Elizabeth Bulwer-Lytton (née Warburton-Lytton) and built in 1817 in memory of her parents Richard Warburton-Lytton (1745–1810) and Elizabeth (née Jodrell) of Knebworth House. It is set in parkland at a distance from the Church of St Mary and St Thomas, a Grade I listed building.

Until the construction of the mausoleum, the Lytton family of Knebworth House used the Lytton Chapel, attached to the north side of St Mary's church, for interments. This chapel was rebuilt around 1710 to house three exceptionally fine monuments dedicated to members of the family.

Burials
Inside the mausoleum are a number of coffins, including that of Elizabeth Bulwer-Lytton (1770–1843). A casket holds the ashes of Lady Constance Bulwer-Lytton (1869–1923). She joined the suffragette movement, and, as her epitaph states “sacrificed her health and talents in helping to bring victory to this cause”.

Architecture and conservation
The architect of the octagonal, stone building was John Buonarotti Papworth.  His design is neoclassical. The roof supports a sarcophagus with shell acroteria.

The building and the railings which enclose it were Grade II listed in 1968.

References

External links
 

Buildings and structures completed in 1817
John Buonarotti Papworth buildings and structures
Mausoleums in England
Grade II listed monuments and memorials
Monuments and memorials in Hertfordshire
Grade II listed buildings in Hertfordshire
Neoclassical architecture in Hertfordshire
Regency architecture in England
Knebworth